The Maio Champion's Cup or the Maio Champion's Trophy (Portuguese: Taça da Campeões de Maio, Capeverdean Creole: ALUPEK: Tasa da Kampionis di Maiu) is a single knockout football (soccer) competition that is played each season in the island of Maio, Cape Verde. The competition features the champion from the Premier Division and the champion of the Second Division.  The trophy competition is organized by the Maio Regional Football Association (Associação Regional do Maio, ARFM). Its current winner is Onze Unidos who won their only title.

The Champion's Cup (or Trophy) was introduced in 2016.  The first edition took place in November, 2016 and featured Académico 83 (Premier Division) and Real Marítimo (Second Division) which were the first club to participate.

Winners

Performance By Club

Performance by area

See also
Maio Premier Division
Maio Second Division
Maio Island Cup
Maio Super Cup
Maio Opening Tournament

References

External links
Maio Regional Football Association which includes the Champion's Cup (or Trophy) 

Sport in Maio, Cape Verde
Football cup competitions in Cape Verde
2016 establishments in Cape Verde
Recurring sporting events established in 2016